Robert James Kenneth Peston (born 25 April 1960) is an English journalist, presenter, and author. He is the political editor of ITV News and host of the weekly political discussion show Peston (previously Peston on Sunday). From 2006 until 2014, he was the business editor of BBC News and its economics editor from 2014 to 2015. He became known to the wider public with his reporting on the late 2000s financial crisis, especially with his exclusive information on the Northern Rock crisis. He is the founder of the education charity Speakers for Schools.

Early life

Robert James Kenneth Peston was born into a Jewish family on 25 April 1960, the son of Helen Conroy and Maurice Peston, Baron Peston (1931–2016), an economist and Labour life peer. As the son of a life baron, he is entitled to the courtesy title "The Honourable", but does not use it. He attended Highgate Wood Secondary School in London. He graduated with a second-class degree in philosophy, politics and economics from Balliol College, Oxford, and then studied at the Université libre de Bruxelles.

Career

Peston briefly worked as a stockbroker at Williams de Broë, becoming a journalist in 1983 at the Investors Chronicle and joining The Independent newspaper on its launch in 1986. From 1989 to 1990, Peston worked for the short-lived Sunday Correspondent newspaper as Deputy City Editor, before being appointed City Editor of the Independent on Sunday in 1990.

From 1991 to 2000, he worked for the Financial Times. At the FT, he was – at various times – Political Editor, Banking Editor and head of an investigations unit (which he founded). During his time as Political Editor, he memorably fell out with the then Downing Street Press Secretary Alastair Campbell, who regularly mimicked Peston's habit of flicking back his hair, and once responded to a difficult question with the words: "Another question from the Peston school of smartarse journalism." He became close friends with fellow journalist, now PR man, Roland Rudd, where the two were known as the "Pest and the Rat". His last position at the FT was Financial Editor (in charge of business and financial coverage).

In 2000, he became editorial director of the online financial analysis service Quest, owned by the financial firm Collins Stewart. At the same time, he became a contributing editor of The Spectator and a weekly columnist for The Daily Telegraph. In 2001, he switched allegiance from the Telegraph to the Sunday Times, where he wrote a weekly business profile, Peston's People, and left The Spectator for the New Statesman, where he wrote a weekly column. In 2002, he joined The Sunday Telegraph as City editor and assistant editor. He became associate editor in 2005.

In late 2005, it was announced that Peston would succeed Jeff Randall as BBC Business Editor, responsible for business and City coverage on the corporation's flagship TV and radio news programmes, the BBC News Channel, its website and on Radio 4's Today.

While no impropriety on the part of Peston was implied, it was claimed in The Observer on 19 October 2008, that the Serious Fraud Office (SFO) could enquire into the source of one of Peston's scoops which, in September 2008, in the fraught atmosphere of the global financial crisis, revealed that merger talks between HBOS and Lloyds TSB were at an advanced stage. In the minutes before the broadcast, buyers purchased millions of HBOS shares at the deflated price of 96p; in the hour following it, they could be sold for 215p. The Conservative MP Greg Hands had written to the SFO about this.

On 4 February 2009, Peston appeared as a witness at the House of Commons Treasury Select Committee, along with Alex Brummer (City Editor, Daily Mail), Lionel Barber (editor of the Financial Times), Sir Simon Jenkins (The Guardian) and Sky News Business Editor Jeff Randall to answer questions on the role of the media in financial stability and "whether financial journalists should operate under any form of reporting restrictions during banking crises."

On 28 August 2009, Peston had a highly publicised row with James Murdoch, following the latter's MacTaggart lecture. More recently, he repeatedly broke stories relating to News International's involvement with phone hacking at times which were perceived as advantageous to the company, leading to criticism that he had become a Murdoch stooge.

Peston is the founder of Speakers for Schools, a pro-bono education venture which organises speakers from the worlds of business, politics, media, the arts, science, engineering and sports to give talks for free in state schools.

On 17 October 2013, Peston was appointed Economics Editor of BBC News, replacing Stephanie Flanders who was appointed as Chief Market Strategist at JP Morgan Asset Management. He continued as Business Editor, as well until his replacement Kamal Ahmed took over the post on 24 March 2014.

On 4 October 2015, it was announced that Peston would leave the BBC to join ITV News as their Political Editor, replacing Tom Bradby who became the main presenter of News at Ten. Peston made his last appearance on BBC News on 25 November 2015, and his first appearance on ITV's News at Ten on 11 January 2016. He had a significant scoop in April 2016, when Prime Minister David Cameron stated in an interview he had profited from his father's offshore Blairmore Holdings trust, after information about the trust had been disclosed in the Panama Papers release.

He presents ITV's new weekly political discussion show, Peston on Sunday, which started on 8 May 2016. In 2018, the programme moved to a Wednesday night timeslot, rebranded as Peston.

In December 2019, Peston apologised for incorrectly tweeting, without verification, that a Labour activist had punched a Conservative Party adviser. Footage was soon released showing that this was not true; he later apologised for his remarks and retracted them. In 2020, he said that Boris Johnson's government had become socialistic, and was "more Castro than Castro".

Awards

Peston has won the Harold Wincott Senior Financial Journalist of the Year Award (2005), the London Press Club's Scoop of the Year Award (2005), Granada Television's What the Papers Say award for Investigative Journalist of the Year (1994) and the Wincott Young Financial Journalist of the Year (1986).

At the Royal Television Society's Television Journalism Awards 2008/09 Peston won both "Specialist Journalist of the Year" and "Television Journalist of the Year" for his coverage of the credit crunch and a string of 'scoops' associated with it. Also, his scoop on Lloyds TSB's takeover of HBOS won the Royal Television Society's "Scoop of the Year" award. He was voted Best Performer in a Non-Acting Role in the Broadcasting Press Guild's 2009 awards and Business Journalist of the Year in the London Press Club's 2009 awards. In the 2008 Wincott Awards, he won the Broadcaster of the Year Award and he won the online award for his blog.

In 2009, he was named Political Journalist of the Year in the Political Studies Association Awards, and he topped polls of the general public and journalists carried out by Press Gazette to find the highest rated finance and business journalist.

Peston's scoop on Northern Rock seeking emergency financial help from the Bank of England won the Royal Television Society's Television Journalism Award for Scoop of the Year in the 2007/8 awards and the Wincott Award for Business News/Current Affairs Programme of the Year. He was Journalist of the Year in the Business Journalism of the Year Awards for 2007/08, and also won in the Scoop category.

Peston won the Work Foundation's Broadcast News Journalism Award and the Foundation's Radio Programme of the Year Award (for his File on 4, "The Inside Story of Northern Rock"). His blog won the digital media category in the Private Equity and Venture Capital Journalist of the Year Awards.

Peston received an Honorary Doctorate from Heriot-Watt University in 2010. In 2011, he was honoured as a Fellow of Aberystwyth University in recognition of "his success in journalism, his insightful writing and his contribution to the local community".

Delivery style
Peston's delivery on radio and television news has attracted comment. Tim Teeman in The Times described his "intonation" as "raggedy [and] querulous" in 2008, and Ann Treneman described Peston as "excruciatingly hard to listen to" in 2009. Elizabeth Grice in The Daily Telegraph identified "strangulated diction" and "repetition of small words" among his traits; in the same article, maintaining he is "loads better than [he] was", Peston himself conceded he is "still not as polished as some". His characteristic mannerisms have been observed by impressionist Rory Bremner.

Books

Peston published his biography of Gordon Brown, Brown's Britain, in January 2005. It details the rivalry between Brown and the then Prime Minister Tony Blair. Brown's Britain was described by Sir Howard Davies, former director of the London School of Economics, as "a book of unusual political significance". The cover of the book describes how "Peston was given unprecedented access to Gordon Brown and his friends and colleagues." Having told Brown's side of the Blair/Brown power struggle, it is believed that Peston used the relationship then built up with Brown for many of his later financial news story "scoops" at the BBC.

In February 2008, Hodder & Stoughton published Peston's book Who Runs Britain? How the Super-Rich are Changing our Lives. In The Guardian, Polly Toynbee said of it: "Reading Peston's book, you can only be flabbergasted all over again at how Labour kowtowed to wealth, glorified the City and put all the nation's economic eggs into one dangerous basket of fizzy finance."

In September 2012, Hodder & Stoughton published How Do We Fix This Mess? The Economic Price of Having it All and the Route to Lasting Prosperity. The Observer described it as "A must read...mandatory reading for anyone who wants to have a voice in where we go from here."

His book WTF? was published by Hodder & Stoughton in November 2017 and charts the events that led up to the 2016 Brexit referendum. Whistleblower, his first novel, appeared in September 2021. The protagonist is a lobby journalist (political reporter) for the fictional Financial Chronicle and the colourful background to the story, set at the time of the 1997 general election in Britain, reflects Peston's detailed knowledge of his subject.

Personal life

Peston married British-Canadian writer Siân Busby in 1998, and the two had a son named Maximilian. They had known each other since their teenage years and only rekindled their relationship after her friend, Peston's sister Juliet, was hospitalised after a car crash. In the intervening years, Busby had been married and divorced; Peston became the step-father of her son from that marriage. Busby died in September 2012, at the age of 51, of lung cancer. In September 2018, Peston said he felt guilty after falling in love with another woman several years after his wife's death, and revealed that he was now in a relationship with author and journalist Charlotte Edwardes.

Peston lives in the Muswell Hill area of London. After his home was burgled in December 2012, he made an appeal for the return of rings that had belonged to his late wife. 

Peston is a lifelong supporter of Arsenal FC. He was born into a non-religious Jewish family, and has described himself as culturally Jewish rather than religiously so. In a similar vein, his father was a patron of the British Humanist Association and an Honorary Associate of the National Secular Society, as well as once describing himself as someone "who regards all religious belief as failing to meet even the most elementary epistemological and deontological criteria".

In September 2021, Peston stated that he had recently recovered from a COVID-19 infection.

Filmography

Style and titles

Robert James Kenneth Peston (1960–87)

The Honourable Robert James Kenneth Peston (since 1987) (He doesn't use this, even though he is entitled to.)

See also

Courtesy titles in the United Kingdom#Courtesy prefix of "The Honourable"

References

External links

 
 Debrett's People of Today
 Peston's blog on BBC site

|-

|-

1960 births
Living people
Alumni of Balliol College, Oxford
British Ashkenazi Jews
BBC newsreaders and journalists
British biographers
British business and financial journalists
British business writers
English Jews
Place of birth missing (living people)
English male journalists
English male non-fiction writers
Financial Times people
Université libre de Bruxelles alumni
The Independent people
ITN newsreaders and journalists
British male bloggers
Online journalists
People educated at Highgate Wood Secondary School
People from Crouch End
People from Muswell Hill
People with speech impediment
Robert Peston
Sons of life peers
The Sunday Times people
Male biographers
20th-century British Jews
21st-century British Jews